Bloody Sunday of February 18, 1900, was a day of high Imperial casualties in the Second Boer War.

Background
It occurred on the first day of the Battle of Paardeberg. A combined British-Canadian force of 6,000 finally trapped a group of approximately 5,000 Boer soldiers and some civilians, under Piet Cronjé, in a bend of the Modder River near Kimberley, having advanced from south of the Modder River on the 11th. The Boers defended a series of trenches on Paardeberg Hill.

The Imperial commander, Kitchener (temporarily replacing the unwell Roberts), began the battle by ordering a charge straight at the Boer trenches. The Highland Brigade and the 2nd (Special Service) Battalion, The Royal Canadian Regiment of Infantry, led the attack.

The Boer soldiers withheld fire until the British soldiers were within . The British were pinned and the exchange of fire continued until nightfall when the British withdrew. The Highlanders took almost 300 casualties; the Canadian losses were 18 dead and 60 wounded. Attacks elsewhere along the line resulted in a total 1,100 casualties, with two hundred killed -- the worst single day loss for the Imperial forces.

After the first assault Roberts retook command that evening. With the Boers trapped he ordered the digging of trenches and a bombardment, which continued for nine days. On 27 February, after a confused night attack, the surviving Boer soldiers surrendered - around 4,000 in total.

A further 2,000 Imperial soldiers died or were invalided at Paardeberg from illness, mostly due to drinking the water of the Modder River, downstream from where the Boer were throwing horse and cattle corpses killed by the artillery fire.

See also 
Military history of South Africa
Black Week

References

Bloody Sunday
Bloody Sunday
Conflicts in 1900
1900 in the Orange Free State
History of the Free State (province)
February 1900 events

af:Slag van Paardeberg#Bloedige Sondag